The Chinese Taipei men's national field hockey team represents Taiwan in men's international field hockey competitions and is controlled by the Chinese Taipei Hockey Association, the governing body for field hockey in Taiwan.

Taiwan participated once in the Asian Games in 2006 and in the Asia Cup in 2013.

Tournament record

Asian Games
 2006 – 8th place

Asia Cup
 2013 – 8th place

AHF Cup
1997 – 7th place
2002 – 
2008 – 5th place
2012 – 4th place
2016 – 7th place

FIH Hockey Series
2018–19 – First round

See also
Chinese Taipei women's national field hockey team

References

National team
Asian men's national field hockey teams
Field hockey